The Holographic Versatile Disc (HVD) is an optical disc technology that was expected to store up to several terabytes of data on an optical disc 10 cm or 12 cm in diameter. Its development commenced in April 2004, but it never arrived due to lack of funding. The company responsible for HVD went bankrupt in 2010.

The reduced radius reduces cost and materials used. It employs a technique known as collinear holography, whereby a blue-green and red laser beam are collimated in a single beam. The blue-green laser reads data encoded as laser interference fringes from a holographic layer near the top of the disc. A red laser is used as the reference beam to read servoinformation from a regular CD-style aluminium layer near the bottom. Servoinformation is used to monitor the position of the read head over the disc, similar to the head, track, and sector information on a conventional hard disk drive. On a CD or DVD this servoinformation is interspersed among the data. A dichroic mirror layer between the holographic data and the servo data reflects the blue-green laser while letting the red laser pass through. This prevents interference from refraction of the blue-green laser off the servo data pits and is an advance over past holographic storage media, which either experienced too much interference, or lacked the servo data entirely, making them incompatible with current CD and DVD drive technology.

Standards for 100 GB read-only holographic discs and 200 GB recordable cartridges were published by ECMA in 2007, but no holographic disc product has ever appeared in the market. A number of release dates were announced, all since passed, likely due to high costs of the drives and discs itself, lack of compatibility with existing or new standards, and competition from video streaming.

Technology

Current optical storage saves one bit per pulse, and the HVD alliance hopes to improve this efficiency with capabilities of around 60,000 bits per pulse in an inverted, truncated cone shape that has a 200 μm diameter at the bottom and a 500 μm diameter at the top. High densities are possible by moving these closer on the tracks: 100 GB at 18 μm separation, 200 GB at 13 μm, 500 GB at 8 μm, and most demonstrated of 5 TB for 3 μm on a 10 cm disc.

The system uses a green laser, with an output power of 1 watt which is high power for a consumer device laser.  Possible solutions include improving the sensitivity of the polymer used, or developing and commoditizing a laser capable of higher power output while being suitable for a consumer unit.

Competing technologies
HVD is not the only technology in high-capacity, holographic storage media. InPhase Technologies was developing a rival holographic format called Tapestry Media, which they claimed would eventually store 1.6 TB with a data transfer rate of 120 MB/s, and several companies are developing TB-level discs based on 3D optical data storage technology. Such large optical storage capacities compete favorably with the Blu-ray Disc format. However, in 2006, holographic drives were projected to initially cost around US$15,000, and a single disc around US$120–180, although prices were expected to fall steadily. Since InPhase Technologies was unable to deliver their promised product, they ran out of funds and went bankrupt in 2010.

Holography System Development Forum
The Holography System Development Forum (HSD Forum; formerly the HVD Alliance and the HVD FORUM) is a coalition of corporations purposed to provide an industry forum for testing and technical discussion of all aspects of HVD design and manufacturing.

, the following companies are members of the forum:

CBCGroup
Daicel
FujiFilm
Konica Minolta Inc.
Kyoeisha
Pulstec
Shibaura Mechatronics Corporation
Oracle Corporation
Teijin Chemicals Ltd.
Tokiwa Optical Corporation

, the following companies are supporting companies of the forum:

Kodate Laboratory

Standards
On December 9, 2004, at its 88th General Assembly, the standards body Ecma International created Technical Committee 44, dedicated to standardizing HVD formats based on Optware's technology.

On June 11, 2007, TC44 published the first two HVD standards: ECMA-377, defining a 200 GB HVD "recordable cartridge" and ECMA-378, defining a 100 GB HVD-ROM disc. Its next stated goals were 30 GB HVD cards and submission of these standards to the International Organization for Standardization for ISO approval.

General Electric
General Electric Global Research Centers created a holographic disc that could hold many times the data of a Blu-Ray — up to 500 GB. As the technology is quite similar to CD, DVD, and Blu-ray technologies, the players were to be cross-compatible with these formats.

See also

 DVD
 Compact Disc
 Blu-ray
 HD DVD
 Ultra Density Optical (UDO)
 Professional Disc for DATA (PDD or ProDATA)
 Holographic memory
 3D optical data storage
 Magneto-optical drive (MO)
 Holographic Versatile Card
 Stacked Volumetric Optical Disk (SVOD)
 InPhase Technologies

References

External links
DaTARIUS signs agreement with InPhase Technologies to be their sole sales, service and support supplier of Tapestry Media hardware and media to ship starting in 2007 (300 GB WORM discs) with 600 GB discs and re-writable technology in 2008 as well as 1.6 TB media available in 2010.
Optware, creator of HVD format.
InPhase, a now bankrupt, company that developed a competing holographic storage format.
Video explaining holographic storage – PC Magazine, October 4, 2006
Holography system rides single beam EE Times, February 27, 2006 – interview with Hideyoshi Horimai and Yoshio Aoki of Optware Corp.
Holographic storage standards eyed EE Times, February 28, 2006 – article about the upcoming technical committee meeting to begin standardization of HVD.
How stuff works explains how HVD works.
Elusive Green Laser Is Missing Ingredient Wall Street Journal February 13, 2008
General Electric unveils 500GB optical disc storage

Audiovisual introductions in 2004
120 mm discs
Ecma standards
Holographic data storage
Rotating disc computer storage media
Vaporware